Horní Čermná is a municipality and village in Ústí nad Orlicí District in the Pardubice Region of the Czech Republic. It has about 1,000 inhabitants.

Administrative parts
The village of Nepomuky is an administrative part of Horní Čermná.

Notable people
Petr Šilar (born 1956), politician

References

External links

Villages in Ústí nad Orlicí District